is a 2012 Japanese animated action fantasy film based on the Pretty Cure franchise created by Izumi Todo. The film is directed by Junji Shimizu, written by Yoshimi Narita, and produced by Toei Animation. The film was released in Japan on March 17, 2012.

Marking the fourth entry to the Pretty Cure All Stars crossover film series, and the first installment to the New Stage trilogy, the Smile PreCure! team joins the previous Pretty Cure teams as they encounter Fusion once again, while befriending a girl named Ayumi.

Plot
In Yokohama, Fusion reappears once again and threatens the city with calamity. Then, the Pretty Cures assemble and defeats Fusion again, scattering its parts around the city. Meanwhile, a girl named Ayumi Sakagami, who admires the Pretty Cures and witnesses the battle against Fusion, is having trouble making friends at her new school. On her way back home, Ayumi meets a small creature, and decides to name it "Fū-chan". Meanwhile, the fairies: Tart, Chiffon, Chypre, Coffret, Potpurri, Hummy and Candy gather for a meeting, and notices that Fusion's scattered parts are looking to recombine, so they all go and ask their respective Pretty Cure teams to search for the fragments to prevent its return.

While searching for the fragments, Miyuki encounters the Suite PreCure teams: Hibiki, Kanade, Ellen and Ako, whom all transforms and fight the fragments. Meanwhile, Ayumi notices that people around here are disappearing, and Fū-chan admits he did this for Ayumi in case anyone makes Ayumi suffer. Then, the Smile PreCure! teams assemble and fights Fū-chan, but shocked as he's absorbing their attacks. As the Suite team arrives to assist them, Ayumi stops them from hurting him. The Cures reveal to her that Fū-chan is a fragment of Fusion, and Fū-chan runs away as he tries to make Ayumi's wish granted while destroying the city.

While accompanied by Smile and Suite teams, as well as HeartCatch PreCure! and Fresh Pretty Cure teams, Ayumi is caught by Fusion's familiars, which in her heart's response to Fū-chan, she transforms into Cure Echo. Using the power of the Miracle Lights and aided by latter Pretty Cure teams: Futari wa Pretty Cure Max Heart, Futari wa Pretty Cure Splash Star, and Yes! PreCure 5 GoGo!, Echo rekindles her friendship with Fū-chan. As the remaining Fusion fragments gets ready to attack Ayumi, Fū-chan sacrifices himself to give the Smile team the powers to defeat the evil side. Afterwards, Ayumi grows more confident and starts making friends with her classmates.

Voice cast
Smile PreCure! cast
Misato Fukuen as Miyuki Hoshizora/Cure Happy
Asami Tano as Akane Hino/Cure Sunny
Hisako Kanemoto as Yayoi Kise/Cure Peace
Marina Inoue as Nao Midorikawa/Cure March
Chinami Nishimura as Reika Aoki/Cure Beauty
Ikue Ōtani as Candy

Suite PreCure cast
Ami Koshimizu as Hibiki Hojo/Cure Melody
Fumiko Orikasa as Kanade Minamino/Cure Rhythm
Megumi Toyoguchi as Siren/Ellen Kurokawa/Cure Beat
Rumi Okubo as Ako Shirabe/Cure Muse
Kotono Mitsuishi as Hummy

HeartCatch PreCure! cast
Nana Mizuki as Tsubomi Hanasaki/Cure Blossom
Fumie Mizusawa as Erika Kurumi/Cure Marine
Houko Kuwashima as Itsuki Miyoudouin/Cure Sunshine
Aya Hisakawa as Yuri Tsukikage/Cure Moonlight
Taeko Kawata as Chypre
Motoko Kumai as Coffret
Kokoro Kikuchi as Potpurri

Fresh Pretty Cure! cast
Kanae Oki as Love Momozono/Cure Peach
Eri Kitamura as Miki Aono/Cure Berry
Akiko Nakagawa as Inori Yamabuki/Cure Pine
Yuka Komatsu as Setsuna Higashi/Cure Passion
Taiki Matsuno as Tart
Satomi Kōrogi as Chiffon

Film characters
Mamiko Noto as Ayumi Sakagami/Cure Echo
Tamao Akae as Ayumi's mother
Takehito Koyasu as Fusion
Sea Kumada as Fuu-chan

Production
On November 2011, it was announced that new Pretty Cure All Stars was in development, featuring the villain Fusion from the very first film. Pretty Cure episode director Junji Shimizu will act as a director, and Yes! PreCure 5 GoGo! head writer Yoshimi Narita will provide the screenplay, while Mitsuru Aoyama will return from Pretty Cure All Stars DX trilogy to design the characters and provide the animation direction for the film, and music composer Yasuharu Takanashi. A Yokohama city tie-in campaign was announced on February 2012 by its city mayor, Fumiko Hayashi.

Release
The film was released in theaters in Japan on March 17, 2012.

Reception

Box office
The film ranked number 5 out of top 10 in the Japanese box office in its fourth weekend.

References

External links
 

2010s Japanese films
2012 anime films
Pretty Cure films
Toei Animation films
Japanese magical girl films
Crossover anime and manga
Films scored by Yasuharu Takanashi
Films set in Yokohama